The synagogue in Pidhaitsi, Ternopil Oblast in Ukraine, was built in the 17th century. Today it is a ruin.

History 
The synagogue was built as a fortress synagogue probably between 1621 and 1648.
  Over the years annexes were added. During World War II and the Holocaust the local Jewish community was wiped out. Afterwards the building was used as a storehouse for several years. Today it stands empty and is in a ruinous state.

Architecture 
The exterior of the main building (the men's prayer hall) is nearly square (30.60 × 30.40 m). It is surrounded by one- and two storeyed extensions. The northern and western extensions were already built in the 17th century, while the ones to the south and to the east were added after 1945 when the building was used as a storehouse.

From the eastern side the main volume is supported by two buttresses.

With its high windows and pointed arches and limestone framings the building bears features of the Gothic style.

The niche of the Holy Ark is badly damaged. The Bimah is missing.

Synagogue in New York 
In 1926 Jewish emigrants from Podhajce (Pidhaitsi) bought a building in  New York and consecrated it as their synagogue. It was called the Podhajcer Shul. Nowadays it is a private residence.

See also 
List of synagogues in Ukraine

References

Synagogues in Ukraine
Former synagogues in Ukraine
17th-century synagogues
fortress synagogues